Ladislav Hexner was a male Yugoslav international table tennis player.

Table tennis career
He won a silver medal at the 1939 World Table Tennis Championships in the Swaythling Cup (men's team event) with Žarko Dolinar, Adolf Herskovic, Tibor Harangozo and Max Marinko for Yugoslavia.

See also
 List of table tennis players
 List of World Table Tennis Championships medalists

References

Yugoslav table tennis players
World Table Tennis Championships medalists